The 2008 IPSC Handgun World Shoot XV held in Bali, Indonesia, was the 15th IPSC Handgun World Shoot.

Champions

Open 
The Open division had the largest match participation with 353 competitors (34.3 %).

Individual

Teams

Modified 
The Modified division had 50 competitors (4.9 %).

Individual

Teams

Standard 
The Standard division had the second largest match participation with 309 competitors (30.1 %).

Individual

Teams

Production 
The Production division had the third largest match participation with 282 competitors (27.4 %).

Individual

Teams

Revolver 
The Revolver division had 34 competitors (3.3 %).

Individual

Teams

See also 
IPSC Rifle World Shoots
IPSC Shotgun World Shoot
IPSC Action Air World Shoot

References

IPSC :: Match Results - 2008 Handgun World Shoot, Indonesia

2008
2008 in shooting sports
Shooting competitions in Indonesia
2008 in Indonesian sport
International sports competitions hosted by Indonesia